Spas Borislavov Delev (born 22 September 1989) is a Bulgarian professional footballer who currently plays as a winger for Ludogorets Razgrad and the Bulgarian national team.

Club career

Youth career
Born in Klyuch, part of Petrich Municipality, Delev started to play football in Pirin. During the season 2007–08 he played for the team in the Bulgarian amateur division. Pirin took first place and were promoted to the "B" professional football group. On 9 August 2008 Delev made his debut in professional football in a match against Botev Krivodol. In this match he scored his first goal in B PFG. In the first half of 2008–09 season Delev scored 8 goals in 16 matches.

New Pirin
After the union of the two Pirin clubs from Blagoevgrad in December 2008, Delev joined the part of the team, which plays in the top division. On 4 March 2009, he scored a goal in a match against CSKA Sofia for the Bulgarian Cup and Pirin eliminated their opponent. In the semi-final of that tournament against Levski, Delev had a tragic accident. After spasm of the lungs he remained to lie on the grass, and later was sent to emergency hospital. It was later found out that he had played with a flu.

Delev made his A PFG debut on 8 March, in a match against Cherno More. On 5 April, he scored twice against Belasitsa Petrich. Those were his first goals in A PFG. On 11 June, Delev was named the Best Young Footballer of the 2008–09 season in Bulgaria. Just 19, Delev's goals helped Pirin to reach the Bulgarian Cup final.

CSKA Sofia

On 27 June 2009, Delev joined CSKA on one-year loan for 2009–10 and later signed a three-year contract. He scored his first goal for CSKA in the second-leg of the UEFA Europa League play-off of against Dynamo Moscow on 27 August 2009, bringing the score to 1–1 with a header. Delev netted the third goal in the victory over The New Saints in the UEFA Europa League play-off. On 16 December 2010, he found the net in a 1–3 away loss to F.C. Porto in the Europa League group stage. He also scored two goals in the Bulgarian Cup semi-final against Litex Lovech on 20 April 2011, as well as the winning goal against Slavia Sofia in the final on 25 May 2011. During the 2010–11 season he managed 13 goals in the league.

Mersin Idmanyurdu
On 12 January 2012, Delev signed a 3,5-year contract with Turkish side Mersin İdmanyurdu. Delev's debut came on 15 January, in a 0–2 home loss against Antalyaspor in a Süper Lig match, during which he appeared as a second-half substitute. On 24 January, Delev netted his first goal for the team, opening the scoring in a 1–2 home loss against Kayserispor. In June 2012, he dissolved his contract due to financial reasons.

CSKA Sofia
After seven months without a club, Delev returned to CSKA Sofia on 31 January 2013.

Las Palmas
On 30 July 2013, Delev completed his move to Las Palmas on a free transfer. He signed a two-year contract and was given the number 22 shirt.

Pogoń Szczecin
On 20 June 2016, Delev signed for Polish side Pogoń Szczecin on a three-year contract. He made his Ekstraklasa debut on 16 July, replacing Mateusz Lewandowski in the 66th minute of Pogoń's 2–1 loss against Wisła Kraków. He scored his first goal in a 4–0 away win against Kalisz in a game of Polish Cup on 10 August. His first league goals for Pogon came on 29 October when he scored twice in a 2–1 home win over Ruch Chorzów. He scored a brace in a 2-4 away win against Nieciecza, on 17 March 2018.

Ludogorets Razgrad
In December 2021, Delev joined Ludogorets Razgrad.

International career
In October 2008, the Bulgarian under-21s manager Ivan Kolev called Delev into the Bulgaria U21 team for the friendly matches with Greece and Macedonia.

He made his debut for the senior side on 26 March 2011, in the UEFA Euro 2012 qualifying match against Switzerland. On 4 June 2011, he came on as a substitute in the qualifier against Montenegro.

His first Bulgaria goals came on his 14th appearance on 25 March 2017, scoring twice in the 2018 FIFA World Cup qualifying match against Netherlands, which ended in a 2–0 victory.

Career statistics

Club

International

International goals
Scores and results list Bulgaria's goal tally first.

Honours

Pirin Blagoevgrad
Bulgarian Cup: Runner-up 2009

CSKA Sofia
Bulgarian Championship: Runner-up 2010
Bulgarian Cup: Winner 2011

Ludogorets Razgrad
Bulgarian First League: 2021–22
Bulgarian Supercup: 2022

Individual
 Bulgarian Best Young Player of the Season – 2008–09

References

External links

1989 births
Living people
Bulgarian footballers
Bulgaria international footballers
Bulgaria under-21 international footballers
Association football forwards
First Professional Football League (Bulgaria) players
Süper Lig players
Segunda División players
Ekstraklasa players
OFC Pirin Blagoevgrad players
PFC Pirin Blagoevgrad players
PFC CSKA Sofia players
Mersin İdman Yurdu footballers
UD Las Palmas players
PFC Lokomotiv Plovdiv players
PFC Beroe Stara Zagora players
Pogoń Szczecin players
FC Arda Kardzhali players
PFC Ludogorets Razgrad players
Bulgarian expatriate footballers
Expatriate footballers in Turkey
Bulgarian expatriate sportspeople in Turkey
Expatriate footballers in Spain
Bulgarian expatriate sportspeople in Spain
Expatriate footballers in Poland
Bulgarian expatriate sportspeople in Poland
People from Blagoevgrad Province
Sportspeople from Blagoevgrad Province